Hububb is a Children's Television programme broadcast on BBC One in the United Kingdom, it was named after Les Bubb who also played the title character with the same name. The show ran from 1997 until 2001. Five series of the show were made. It was repeated on the CBBC Channel in 2002.

The show is about a delivery man who lives in a tower in the centre of Edinburgh who kept getting into all sorts of bother, he is also known for using his trusty mountain bike which he uses for his work.

The show was filmed and set in the Scottish Capital City, Edinburgh and the tower featured in the show was Melville Monument in St Andrew Square. Hububb was made by Noel Gay productions for BBC Scotland.

Cast
 Les Bubb - Les Bubb.
 Miltos Yerolemou - Mikey.
 Elaine C. Smith - Rosa.

See also
 Hounded (CBBC)

References

External links
 Les Bubb

BBC children's television shows
Television shows set in Edinburgh